Karol Rathaus (Karl Leonhard Bruno Rathaus; also Leonhard Bruno; 16 September 1895 — 21 November 1954) was a German-Austrian Jewish composer who immigrated to the United States via Berlin, Paris, and London, escaping the rise of Nazism in Germany.

Life 
Born in the Ukrainian city of Ternopil (part of Austria-Hungary in 1895), Rathaus began composing at an early age, beginning his studies in 1913/1914 at the Academy of Performing Arts and Music in Vienna. His studies were interrupted by military service during the First World War. As one of the favorite pupils of Franz Schreker, Rathaus followed him to the Academy of Music in Berlin, where he continued to study music and composition. After graduation, Rathaus accepted the position of a teacher of composition and music theory at the Berlin University of the Arts. Rathaus lived in Berlin from 1922 to 1932, during which time his first compositions caused a sensation and achieved great success.

After his 1930 opera Fremde Erde,  Rathaus created film music and was among the artistically outstanding film composers in Germany before 1933. He wrote the music for three films by Fyodor Otsep. In 1933 he went to Paris and lived in London from 1934 to 1938, before he finally settled in New York.

In 1940 he became a professor of composition at Queens College. In this position he achieved prestige and popularity. In addition, he was also successful as a composer, writing many commissioned works and several film scores. He died at the age of 59 in the Flushing neighborhood of New York City's borough of Queens. Handwritten manuscripts, published works, and correspondence to and from Rathaus are available for research at the Queens College Special Collections and Archives.

His compositional output includes mostly instrumental works: symphonies, orchestral works, serenades, sonatas and ballets. He saw his compositions in the tradition of Richard Strauss, Gustav Mahler, Igor Stravinsky and his teacher Franz Schreker.

In Nazi Germany, his compositions were classified as "degenerate art" and assigned a performance ban. He is now considered one of the many great 'composers in exile'.

Rathaus was married to Gerta and had a son named Bernt. As of 2016, a documentary film is being made about Rathaus in exile.

Musical Compositions

Opera: 
 Fremde Erde (1930)

Ballet: 
 Der letzte Pierrot (1926)
 Le Lion amoureux (1937)
 
Orchestra:
 Symphony No. 1 (1922)
 Symphony No. 2 (1923)
 Symphony No. 3 (1943)
 4 Dance Pieces (1924)
 Piano Concertino (1925)
 Overture (1927)
 Suite for Violin and Orchestra (1929)
 Incidental music to Uriel Acosta (1930)
 Allegro concertante for Piano and Strings and Trumpet (1930)
 Serenade (1932)
 Symphonic Movement (1933)
 Contrapuntal Triptych (1934)
 Nocturne: Jacob's Dream (1938)
 Piano Concerto (1939)
 Prelude and Gigue (1939)
 Music for Strings (1941)
 Polonaise symphonique (1943)
 Vision dramatique (1945)
 Salisbury Cove Overture (1949)
 Sinfonia concertante (1951)
 Prelude (1953)

Chamber:
 String Quartet No. 1 (1921)
 String Quartet No. 2 (1925)
 String Quartet No. 3 (1936)
 String Quartet No. 4 (1946)
 String Quartet No. 5 (1954)
 Sonata No. 1 for Violin and Piano (1924)
 Sonata No. 2 for Violin and Piano (1938)
 Sonata for Clarinet and Piano (1927)
 Trio for Violin, Clarinet, and Piano (1944)

Solo Music:
 Piano Sonata No. 1 (1920)
 Piano Sonata No. 2 (1924)
 Piano Sonata No. 3 (1927)
 Piano Sonata No. 4 (1946)

Selected filmography
 The Trunks of Mr. O.F. (1931)
 The Brothers Karamazov (1931)
 Here's Berlin (1932)
 The Dictator (1935)
 Let Us Live (1939)

External links
Karol Rathaus Collection Finding Aid, Queens College Special Collections and Archives
Karol Rathaus—An American Composer of Polish Origin... (Polish Music Journal, Vol. 6, No. 1, Summer 2003, article by Martin Schüssler)
Catalog Record at the German National Library (D-NB)

Sources
Schwarz, Boris. “Karol Rathaus.” The Musical Quarterly, vol. 41, no. 4, 1955, pp. 481–495.  www.jstor.org/stable/739972.
Guzy-Pasiak, Jolanta. "Karol Rathaus, the Transplanted Composer." Musicology Today: Émigré Composers 8 (2011): 163-77.

References

1895 births
1954 deaths
20th-century American composers
20th-century American male musicians
20th-century German musicians
Austrian film score composers
Austrian male composers
Austrian Jews
German male composers
German film score composers
German military personnel of World War I
Jewish American film score composers
Jewish emigrants from Nazi Germany to the United States
Male film score composers
Musicians from Ternopil
Pupils of Franz Schreker
Queens College, City University of New York faculty
University of Music and Performing Arts Vienna alumni
20th-century American Jews